Bernard VI may refer to:

 Bernard VI, Count of Armagnac (c. 1270–1319)
 Bernard VI, Lord of Lippe (died 1415), German nobleman
 Bernard VI of Moreuil, noble of Picardy